"If I Am" is a song by American alternative rock band Nine Days. The song was released as the second single from their fourth studio album, The Madding Crowd (2000), in August 2000. "If I Am" was a follow-up to their first single, "Absolutely (Story of a Girl)". The song was written by the band's vocalist, John Hampson.

Song meaning
In September 2000, Nine Days guitarist explained the meaning of "If I Am" in an interview with MTV Radio:

"[The song] is about having patience...It's about two people in a relationship and one person wants all these things, like marriage, commitment, the whole nine yards. And the other person is kind of saying, 'Just have some patience. It will all come, but I can't do this right now. Just wait for me,' you know....Basically it's [about] two different people in two different places [in the relationship]...and the one person is saying, 'Just wait for me. I will be there and we will have all of this, but just have the patience."

Music video
The single's music video, which was directed by German director Ulf Buddensieck, was filmed in September 2000.

Charts

Release history

References

2000 singles
2000 songs
550 Music singles
Nine Days songs